James E. Timilty is the former Massachusetts state senator for the Bristol and Norfolk district, which includes his hometown of Walpole and several other towns. He is a Democrat who served from 2005 to 2017.

On April 12, 2017, following the departure of the previous Norfolk County treasurer, he was appointed to serve the remaining two years of a six-year term; he submitted a letter of resignation form the Senate effective April 28, 2017. His appointment as county treasurer was effective May 2, 2017.

He is the son of former state senator Joseph F. Timilty.

See also
The Timilty family

References

Democratic Party Massachusetts state senators
County treasurers of Norfolk County, Massachusetts
People from Walpole, Massachusetts
Living people
21st-century American politicians
Timilty family
Year of birth missing (living people)